The Hundred Family Surnames, commonly known as Bai Jia Xing, also translated as Hundreds of Chinese Surnames, is a classic Chinese text composed of common Chinese surnames. An unknown author compiled the book during the Song dynasty (960–1279). The book lists 507 surnames. Of these, 441 are single-character surnames and 66 are  double-character surnames. About 800 names have been derived from the original ones.

In the dynasties following the Song, the 13th-century Three Character Classic, the Hundred Family Surnames, and the 6th-century Thousand Character Classic came to be known as San Bai Qian (Three, Hundred, Thousand), from the first character in their titles. They served as instructional books for children, becoming the almost universal introductory literary texts for students (almost exclusively boys) from elite backgrounds and even for a number of ordinary villagers. Each text was available in many versions, printed cheaply and available to all since they did not become superseded. When a student had memorized all three, he had a knowledge of roughly 2,000  characters. Since Chinese did not use an alphabet, this was an effective, though time-consuming, way of giving a crash course in character-recognition before going on to understanding texts and writing characters.

Form
The work is a rhyming poem in lines of eight characters. The surnames are not listed in order of commonality. According to Song dynasty scholar Wang Mingqing (王明清), the first four surnames listed represent the most important families in the empire at the time:

1st: Zhao is the surname of the Song dynasty emperors.
2nd: Qian is the surname of the kings of Wuyue.
3rd: Sun is the surname of the queen Sun Taizhen of Wuyue king Qian Chu.
4th: Li is the surname of the kings of Southern Tang.

The next four, Zhou 周, Wu 吳, Zheng 鄭, and Wang 王, were the surnames of the other wives of Qian Chu, the last king of Wuyue.

Complete text
This text is written in Traditional Chinese. Note that several of these characters may link to the same article.

Prevalence in modern times
In 2013 the Fuxi Institution compiled a ranking of the 400 most common surnames in China.

Under 300th most common
According to the study, the following surnames are not among the 300 most common surnames:

 Yōng 雍 – 339th
 Píng 平 – 315th
 Mǐ 米 – 316th
 Zhàn 湛 – 369th

Under 400th most common
According to the study, the following surnames are not among the 400 most common surnames:

 Bèi (贝/貝)
 Shuǐ (水)
 Wū (邬/鄔)
 Háng (杭)
 Zhú (竺)
 Bǐng (邴)
 Fú (扶)
 Du Dǔ (堵)
 Zǎi (宰)
 Lì (郦/酈) 
 Xì (郤)
 Pú (濮)
 Shòu (寿/壽)
 Tōng (通)
 Jia (郏/郟)
 Bié (别/別)
 Chōng (充)
 Xí (习/習)
 Hóng (红/紅)
 Huàn (宦)
 Ài (艾)
 Shèn (慎)
 Yǔ (庾)
 Zhōng (终/終)
 Jì (暨)
 Bù (步)
 Hóng (弘)
 Lù (禄/祿)
 Shū (殳)
 Wò (沃)
 Wèi (蔚)
 Yuè (越)
 Kuí (夔)
 Mù (牧)
 Shè (厍/厙)
 Zī (訾)
 Kōng (空)
 Kuí (隗)
 Shān (山)
 Wú (毋)
 Niè (乜)
 Yang (养/養)
 Xū (须/須)
 Xún (荀)
 Sháo (韶)
 Bēn (賁/贲)
 Every two syllable name (except for Ōuyáng (欧阳/歐陽))

See also
 Chinese surnames
 List of common Chinese surnames
 Seek for Surname History
 Three Character Classic
 Thousand Character Classic

Notes

References

Citations

Sources

External links 

  in mandarin

Chinese classic texts
Hundred Family Surnames
Chinese children's books